The 2020–21 Miami RedHawks men's basketball team represented Miami University in the 2020–21 NCAA Division I men's basketball season. The RedHawks, led by 4th-year head coach Jack Owens, played their home games at Millett Hall in Oxford, Ohio as members of the East Division of the Mid-American Conference.

Previous season

The RedHawks finished the 2019–20 season 13–19 overall, 5–13 in MAC play to finish in fifth place in the East Division. As the No. 12 seed in the MAC tournament, they defeated Buffalo in the first round before the tournament was cancelled due to the COVID-19 pandemic.

Offseason

Departures

Roster

Schedule and results

Miami had to cancel its game against Defiance due to COVID-19. They have postponed their games against Ohio, Central Michigan, Western Michigan, and Eastern Michigan. They have canceled a game against Akron.

|-
!colspan=9 style=| Non-conference regular season

|-
!colspan=9 style=| MAC regular season

|-
!colspan=9 style=| MAC tournament

Source

References

Miami RedHawks men's basketball seasons
Miami (OH)